Trawalla is a closed station located in the town of Trawalla, on the Ararat railway line in Victoria, Australia. A disused goods yard is located at the station. The station was one of 35 closed to passenger traffic on 4 October 1981 as part of the New Deal timetable for country passengers.
Until the 1980s Trawalla was still used as a staff exchange point to either Ballarat or Beaufort. The line through Trawalla closed in 1995 after all traffic was diverted via Creesy but was reopened in 2004 as part of the Linking Victoria program. The station building still remains and is visible from the Western Highway and from inside the train.

References

External links
 Melway map at street-directory.com.au

Disused railway stations in Victoria (Australia)